AXN is a South Korean cable and satellite television channel focusing on American crime and action TV series. Originally launched in 2005 as a joint venture between Sony and SkyLife, AXN was broadcast from outside South Korea, but it had Korean subtitles, and every trailer was displayed in Korean. (Although Korean audio track was not possible because of local regulations.) Also, it was a version exclusively broadcast to South Korea, different from AXN's South East Asian version in scheduling and programmes. It was available exclusively to SkyLife subscribers but made available to other platforms later.

In April 2011, after switching South Korean partner to what was known then as CU Media (which later became a television division of IHQ, which is in turn owned by cable television provider D'Live), AXN began broadcasting from Seoul, and became a part of CU Media. While respecting South Korean TV rating system and mandatory carriage of local programmes, this enabled Korean voice-overs on their trailers and broadcast of local commercial advertisements.

In January 2020, AXN South Korea, along with two other Sony-owned channels, were sold to former Sony Pictures Television executives at KC Global Media.

References

External links
 

AXN
IHQ (company)
Television channels and stations established in 2005